The 1947 Philadelphia mayoral election saw the reelection of Bernard Samuel. , this is the last election in Philadelphia mayoral history won by a Republican and the last not won by a Democrat. Samuel defeated Democratic Party nominee, first-time candidate Richardson Dilworth. Dilworth would subsequently go on to be the unsuccessful Democratic Party nominee for governor of Pennsylvania in 1950 before being elected Philadelphia district attorney in 1951 and mayor of Philadelphia in 1955

Results

References

1947
Philadelphia
1947 Pennsylvania elections
1940s in Philadelphia